Paška Vas is a settlement on the right bank of the Paka River in the Municipality of Šmartno ob Paki in northern Slovenia. The area is part of the traditional region of Styria. The entire municipality is now included in the Savinja Statistical Region.

A small chapel-shrine in the settlement containing a statue of Saint Mark dates to the last quarter of the 19th century.

References

External links
Paška Vas at Geopedia

Populated places in the Municipality of Šmartno ob Paki